Zabaione or zabaglione is an Italian dessert, or sometimes a beverage, made with egg yolks, sugar, and a sweet wine (usually Moscato d'Asti or Marsala wine). Some versions of the recipe incorporate spirits such as cognac. The dessert version is a light custard, whipped to incorporate a large amount of air. Since the 1960s, in restaurants in areas of the United States with large Italian populations, zabaione is usually served with strawberries, blueberries, peaches, etc., in a champagne coupe. In France, it is called sabayon, while its Italian name is zabaione or zabaglione (or zabajone, an archaic spelling).

The dessert is popular in Argentina and Uruguay, where it is known as sambayón (from the Piedmontese sambajon) and is a popular ice cream flavour. In Colombia, the name is sabajón. In Venezuela, there is also a related egg-based dessert drink called ponche crema. This is consumed almost exclusively during Christmas time.

History 
Though accounts vary, the Italian dessert dates as far back as the second half of the 15th century, when a recipe for Zabaglione appears in the manuscript collection at the Morgan Library Cuoco Napoletano.  In Tuscany, it is said that Zabaglione has been well known since the 16th century, being very popular at the court of Caterina de' Medici.  In Piedmont, it is said that the original name for the sweetmeat was Sambayon, given in honor of Saint Pasquale Baylon.  In Emilia-Romagna, on the other hand, it is claimed to have been named, in 1471, after the condottiere Giovanni Baglioni (in dialect ‘Zuan Bajòun) whose men, in foraging for his troops, could come up only with eggs, honey, white wine, and herbs, - an instance of the trope 'necessity is the mother of (culinary) invention' familiar from the historicized origin legends of many cuisines.

Preparation 
Classic zabaione uses raw egg yolks cooked in a bain-marie and most often served with Marsala (though other wines can be substituted). It can be finished with beaten egg white (meringue) or sometimes with whipped cream.

Occasionally, the wine is omitted when the dish is served to children or those who abstain from alcohol. It is then, in effect, a very different dessert. It may then be sometimes flavored with a small amount of espresso, most commonly called uovo sbattuto.

In French cuisine 
The French adopted the recipe as part of their system of sauces in the 1800s as a dessert cream called sabayon. By the 20th century, the name sabayon was also used to describe savory broths and yolk-based sauces.

See also

References

External links 

 Zabaglione on h2g2

Italian desserts
French desserts
Argentine cuisine
Uruguayan desserts
Colombian cuisine
Custard desserts